Marianne is a French horror streaming television series created and directed by Samuel Bodin, written by Bodin and Quoc Dang Tran and starring Victoire Du Bois, Lucie Boujenah and Tiphaine Daviot. The plot revolves around the young novelist Emma who realizes that the characters she writes in her horror novels are also in the real world. The series was released on 13 September 2019 on Netflix. It was canceled after one season in January 2020.

Plot summary

Cast
 Victoire Du Bois as Emma Larsimon
 Lucie Boujenah as Camille
  as Aurore
  as Séby
 Bellamine Abdelmalek as Arnaud
  as Tonio
 Alban Lenoir as Inspector Ronan
  as Mrs Daugeron
 Corinne Valancogne as Mrs Larsimon
 Patrick d'Assumçao as Fr Xavier
  as Mr Larsimon
 Luna Lou as Teen Emma
 Charlie Loiselier as Teen Aurore
 Bruni Makaya as Teen Séby
 Adam Amara as Teen Arnaud
  as Teen Caroline
  as Marianne

Episodes

References

External links
 
 
 

2010s French drama television series
2010s horror television series
2019 French television series debuts
2019 French television series endings
French horror fiction television series
French-language Netflix original programming
Demons in television
Witchcraft in television